A Storyteller Doll is a clay figurine made by the Pueblo people of New Mexico. The first contemporary storyteller was made by Helen Cordero of the Cochiti Pueblo in 1964 in honor of her grandfather, Santiago Quintana, who was a tribal storyteller. It looks like a figure of a storyteller, usually a man or a woman and its mouth is always open. It is surrounded by figures of children and other things, who represent those who are listening to the storyteller. The motif is based on the traditional "singing mother" motif which depicts a woman with her mouth open holding one or two children.

See also
Mary Ellen Toya

References

Further reading
 
 
  
 
  

Pueblo ceramics
Native American pottery